The Canterbury Australian Football League is an Australian rules football competition in New Zealand and is one of the Leagues governed by AFL New Zealand.
The league was formed in 1974 and became the Canterbury Australian Football League in 1998.
The league includes both senior men's, women's teams and junior teams.
Competition runs from late August to early November.

Current Men's Clubs
Eastern Blues Official Site
University Cougars
Mid Canterbury Eagles Official Site
Christchurch Bulldogs

Current Women's Clubs
Eastern Blues
Girl Titans
Southern Storm
Northern Girls

External links
 Official Canterbury Australian Football League Site 
 Official Mid Canterbury Eagles Football League Site

Australian rules football competitions in New Zealand
Women's Australian rules football leagues